Pamphlett is a surname. Notable people with the surname include:

Thomas Pamphlett (1788?–1838), convict in colonial Australia
Tony Pamphlett (born 1960), English footballer